The Friouato caves, also known as Gouffre de Friouato, are located about 30 km south of the city of Taza, Morocco.
The farthest explored known point is about 272 meters, but its limit is still unknown. Experts believe that it is approximately six kilometers long. There are signs of an underground river believed to flow near the Grottes of Chiker. People of the nearby village say that there have been many explorers visiting the cave, some of whom never came back. A cave diving expedition by Exeter University Speleological Society passed two static sumps in 1969 to discover more large chambers and shafts. The system ends in a massive choke of boulders. This may well be the same massive choke of boulders that can be seen at the end of the upstream passages of the nearby Grotte du Chiker; this choke was also discovered in 1969 by the same group of cavers. Images of both cave systems were taken in 1976 during an expedition by the Cerberus Speleological Society from the UK.

Since spring 2016 the cave is closed for visitors due to the safety reasons.

References

Caves of Morocco
Geography of Fès-Meknès